Peachtree Fork is a stream in Wayne County in the U.S. state of Missouri. It is a tributary of Clark Creek.

Peachtree Fork took its name from a nearby spring where the Indians harvested peaches.

See also
List of rivers of Missouri

References

Rivers of Wayne County, Missouri
Rivers of Missouri